Thomas A. Heppenheimer  (January 1, 1947 – September 9, 2015) was a major space advocate and researcher in planetary science, aerospace engineering, and celestial mechanics. His books are on the recommended reading list of the National Space Society.

Books
A brief history of flight: from balloons to Mach 3 and beyond (2001) 
Colonies in Space (Stackpole, 1977) 
The coming quake: science and trembling on the California earthquake frontier (1988) 
Countdown: A History of Space Flight (1999) 
Development of the Space Shuttle, 1972-1981 Smithsonian Institution Press, 2002. 
Facing the Heat Barrier: A History of Hypersonics NASA SP-2007-4232
First flight: the Wright brothers and the invention of the airplane (2003) 
Flight: a history of aviation in photographs (2004) 
The man-made sun: the quest for fusion power (1984) 
The Real Future Doubleday, 1983. 
The space shuttle decision: NASA's search for a reusable space vehicle (1999) NAS 1.21:4221
Toward distant suns (1979) 
Turbulent skies: the history of commercial aviation (1995)

External links
About the Author: Thomas A. Heppenheimer
 

American astronomers
1947 births
2015 deaths